Lindsey Shaw (born May 10, 1989) is an American actress. She is known for playing Jennifer "Moze" Mosely on the Nickelodeon series Ned's Declassified School Survival Guide. She also co-starred in the 2007 CW sitcom Aliens in America, and was the lead on ABC Family's 2009 comedy series 10 Things I Hate About You. From 2011 to 2017 she played the recurring role of Paige McCullers on the ABC Family teen drama series Pretty Little Liars.

Career
Shaw portrayed Jennifer Ann "Moze" Mosely on the Nickelodeon series Ned's Declassified School Survival Guide, which debuted in 2004 and ended in 2007 after three seasons. She dated her co-star Devon Werkheiser briefly. After the show ended, the sitcom Aliens in America debuted on The CW, where Shaw played the character Claire. Aliens in America was cancelled after one season, lasting only eighteen episodes.

Shaw played the lead role of Kat Stratford in 10 Things I Hate About You. The show lasted one season of twenty episodes. She briefly appeared in Nickelback's "Rockstar" music video. 

Shaw was the 2010 Azalea Queen at the Azalea Festival in Wilmington, North Carolina. She starred as Trip alongside Andy Serkis in Ninja Theory's videogame Enslaved: Odyssey to the West, released in October 2010.

In 2011, she landed the recurring role of Paige McCullers, Emily's girlfriend on Pretty Little Liars. Also in 2011, Shaw appeared as Lisa in the ABC Family original film Teen Spirit. The following year, Shaw starred in the film 16-Love as Ally Mash, a hard-working tennis player who learns to loosen up with the help of a carefree male tennis player. She appeared as June in five episodes of the third and final season of the ABC sitcom Suburgatory.

Shaw joined the cast of Faking It in 2015 as Michael J. Willett's character Shane Harvey's sister, Sasha Harvey, who served as a love interest for Gregg Sulkin's character Liam Booker.

Filmography

Video game

Awards and nominations

References

External links
 

1989 births
21st-century American actresses
Actresses from Nebraska
American child actresses
American film actresses
American television actresses
Living people
Actors from Lincoln, Nebraska
Musicians from Lincoln, Nebraska